USNS Matthew Perry (T-AKE-9) is a  of the United States Navy, named in honor of Commodore Matthew C. Perry (1794–1858), who led the effort to open Japan to trade with the West.

The contract to build Matthew Perry was awarded to National Steel and Shipbuilding Company (NASSCO) of San Diego, California, on 30 January 2006. Her keel was laid down on 3 October 2008. She was launched and christened on 16 August 2009, sponsored by Hester Evans, a great-great-great-granddaughter of Commodore Perry.

Service
Matthew Perry was one of several participating in disaster relief after the 2011 Tōhoku earthquake and tsunami.

See also
 , for other ships named after Commodore Perry

Notes

References

External links

 

Lewis and Clark-class dry cargo ships
2009 ships
Ships built in San Diego